Bartholomew Henry "Bart" Allen II  is a superhero appearing in American comic books published by  DC Comics. A speedster, he first appeared under the alias Impulse and later became the second Kid Flash and the fourth Flash. Created by Mark Waid and Mike Wieringo, Bart first made a cameo in The Flash (vol. 2) #91 in 1994 before his full debut in issue #92. He has since been featured as the lead character in Impulse (1995–2002) and The Flash: The Fastest Man Alive (2006–2007). Bart also appears in the series Young Justice and Teen Titans as a member of both superhero teams. In addition to the Teen Titans and Young Justice, Bart was a core character in 10 issues of Justice League of America under the mantle of the Flash.

As first conceived by writers, Bart was born in the 30th century to Meloni Thawne and Don Allen, and is part of a complex family tree of superheroes and supervillains. His father, Don, is one of the Tornado Twins and his paternal grandfather is Barry Allen, the second Flash. His paternal grandmother, Iris West, is also the adoptive aunt of the third Flash, Wally West (Bart's first cousin once removed). Additionally, Bart is the first cousin of XS, a Legionnaire and daughter of Dawn Allen. On his mother's side, he is a descendant of supervillains Professor Zoom and Cobalt Blue as well as the half-brother of Owen Mercer, the second Captain Boomerang. In addition to these relatives, he had a supervillain clone known as Inertia.

For most of his superhero career, Bart was the teenage sidekick to the Wally West version of the Flash. After West's apparent death in the Infinite Crisis crossover event in 2006, Allen grew up and became the Flash. His tenure as the Flash was brief and concluded with his death in issue 13 of The Flash: The Fastest Man Alive. Allen was subsequently absent for nearly two years after his apparent death, but resurfaced—young again—as Kid Flash, in 2009's Final Crisis: Legion of 3 Worlds. During DC's The New 52 era, Bart Allen was reintroduced in Teen Titans as the alias of an amnesiac revolutionary from the future named Bar Torr; the character was later written out of comics, and his tenure erased from continuity by the subsequent DC Rebirth initiative. The original Bart Allen was brought back as part of DC Rebirth's Wonder Comics Young Justice series.

Outside of comics, Bart has been portrayed by Kyle Gallner in the live-action television series Smallville. Jason Marsden voiced the character in the animated series Young Justice. Jordan Fisher portrays a variation of the character as the future son of Barry Allen and Iris West-Allen starting in the seventh season of The CW Arrowverse television series The Flash as a recurring character.

Fictional character biography

Initial reference
As depicted in a Legion of Super-Heroes story, Barry Allen's children—the Tornado Twins—were arrested in A.D. 2995 by the government of Earth, which had fallen under the covert control of the Dominators. Following a one-day trial on trumped-up charges of treason, the Twins were executed. According to a Daily Planet news report, Don Allen is survived by his wife Carmen Johnson (whose real name was Meloni Thawne), his mother Iris West Allen, and his two-year-old son: Barry Allen II. This timeline was wiped out by the events of Zero Hour: Crisis in Time miniseries.

Impulse

In the new post-Zero Hour timeline, Bart Allen was the son of Don Allen and Meloni Thawne (a descendant of Eobard Thawne). The Tornado Twins of this timeline were killed in an invasion by the Dominators that took place years before this timeline's Legion of Super-Heroes was founded, when Bart was a baby. Bart was born with full super-speed; his cousin Jenni Ognats, daughter of Dawn Allen and Jeven Ognats, did not at first display any signs of super-speed. At the sight of seeing her father tortured, her latent super-speed powers activated and would go on to join the Legion under the name XS. Subsequent to the restoration of the DC multiverse, this along with the entire history of the post-Zero Hour Legion was retconned to have taken place on the parallel world of Earth-247, with the Tornado Twins and their families having traveled there from New Earth.

Suffering from a hyper-accelerated metabolism, Bart Allen was aging at a faster rate than that of any other human being, thus causing him to appear the age of twelve when he was chronologically only two years old. To prevent him from developing mental health problems, he was raised in a virtual reality machine which created a simulated world that kept pace with his own scale of time. When it became clear that this method was not helping, his grandmother, Iris Allen, took him back in time to the present where The Flash, Wally West, tricked Bart into a race around the world. By forcing Bart into an extreme burst of speed, Wally managed to shock his hyper metabolism back to normal. Because he had spent the majority of his childhood in a simulated world, Bart had no concept of danger and was prone to leaping before he looked. The youth proved to be more trouble than Wally could handle, and he was palmed off onto retired superhero speedster Max Mercury, who moved Bart to Manchester, Alabama. Bart originally created the Impulse codename for himself, though a retcon in Impulse #50 has Batman codenaming him such as a warning, not a compliment.

Bart joined the Titans early in his career before going on to become one of the founding members of the superhero team Young Justice alongside Robin and Superboy. For a time, Impulse became the owner of a spaceship granted to him by a rich sultan in appreciation for having helped save his castle. The team used this ship to reunite Doiby Dickles with his queen and restore the rightful rule of Myrg. Impulse stayed with Young Justice for an extensive period of time during which he developed the ability to make speed-force energy duplicates. This allowed him to be in multiple places at once. The newly acquired power proved useful until one of the duplicates was killed during the "Our Worlds at War" storyline when half the team was lost on Apokolips. Bart quit Young Justice temporarily as the death of his duplicate led him to come to terms with his own mortality.

Following Max Mercury's disappearance, Bart was taken in by Jay Garrick, the first Flash, and his wife Joan. After the breakup of Young Justice, Bart joined some of his former teammates in a new line-up of the Teen Titans.

Kid Flash

Shortly after Bart joined the Teen Titans, he was shot in the knee by Deathstroke (who at the time was possessed by Jericho) and received a prosthetic one. While recovering, Bart read every single book in the San Francisco Public Library and reinvented himself as the new Kid Flash. Once healed, the artificial knee did not affect his ability to run at speeds approaching that of light, but reminding him that he needs to think first rather than to act impulsively. When Robin reminded him that by becoming Kid Flash, he would be forced to live in the Flash's shadow, Bart said firmly, "No, he'll be living in mine."

In the "Titans Tomorrow" storyline, Bart assumed the mantle of the Flash after the current Flash died in a "Crisis". In this alternate future he was able to steal the speed of others, a power he used on his past self. This reality shows a grown Bart posing as a member of the so-called Titans of Tomorrow. However he is really a spy working on the behalf of Titans East, a resistance group led by the future Cyborg. Additionally, the future Bart is romantically involved with Rose Wilson, The Ravager.

Infinite Crisis

During the Infinite Crisis, Superboy-Prime attacked Conner Kent (Superboy) and injured or killed several Teen Titans, thus prompting Bart to stop his rampage. He accomplished this by running him at top speed into the Speed Force with the help of veteran speedsters Wally West and Jay Garrick. The feat took its toll on Garrick, who reached his limit before entering the Speed Force, and West, who turned into energy and vanished, leaving Bart alone in the fight against a vastly more powerful Superboy-Prime. Luckily for the young speedster, Barry Allen, Johnny Quick, and Max Mercury, all of whom had been previously absorbed into the Speed Force, appeared and aided him.

After Superboy-Prime managed to escape from his prison, Bart follows him, spending four years in an alternate reality's Keystone City. Returning to his universe with Superboy-Prime, temporarily without his memories of what happened during the crisis and wearing his grandfather's costume, an aged Bart reappeared in Tokyo just in time to fight alongside Superman and many other heroes in the Battle of Metropolis. Getting his memories back, he unleashes his anger against Superboy-Prime for killing Conner Kent and so forcing the villain to retreat from battle. When the battle is over, Bart explains to Jay where he had been, and claimed he had used up the last of his speed, leaving him powerless.

The Flash: The Fastest Man Alive (2006–2009)

Harboring a secret—that the Speed Force was still around, and threatened to overwhelm him—Bart set about creating a normal, mundane life for himself. He got a job as a factory worker at Keystone Motors and tried to leave super-heroics behind him; however, trouble around him eventually led him to don the costume.

When his roommate gained super-powers and became the Griffin, Bart is forced to accept his destiny. Following in the footsteps of his father and grandfather, Bart Allen became the Flash. Not long after defeating the Griffin, the latest Flash moved to Los Angeles to start a new chapter in his life. As a civilian, Bart began training at the Los Angeles Police Academy, focusing on forensics.

Soon after donning the Flash identity, Bart was considered for Justice League membership and got particular support from Batman, who felt he was more than ready for the position. Robin contacted Bart and asked him to return to the Teen Titans. However, after fighting Steppenwolf with the newly reformed Justice League, Bart tried to join the League rather than rejoin the Titans, although he held off on taking an official position until he felt that he was ready.

When Bart confronted Captain Cold at his apartment while following up on a cold case as part of his forensics class- having determined that the victim's head had been frozen and shattered, with Cold the only villain capable of reaching the necessary temperature who didn't have a clear alibi at the time- Zoom appeared and attacked Bart. Zoom was apparently enlisted by Bart's grandmother, Iris, with the goal of immobilizing him before an imminent attack. It was later revealed that Iris only came to the past to warn her grandson about the Rogues (consisting of Abra Kadabra, Mirror Master, Heat Wave, the Pied Piper, the Trickster, Weather Wizard, and Captain Cold), led by Inertia, teaming up. Together they were trying to build a machine that would stop time. As their plan began to come to fruition, Bart was arrested for the fight with Steppenwolf, who was a New God.

Death and legacy
Bart revealed himself as the Flash to fight the Rogues. During the battle, it was revealed that the machine built by Inertia actually drains the Speed Force from an individual instead of freezing time. When the Rogues used it on the Flash, Bart's powers were stripped away from him, leaving him surrounded by the Rogues and leading to the appearance of the Black Flash. Inertia's machine proved unstable, however, and would destroy the West Coast if the Speed Force was not safely released from it. Bart fought the Rogues before chasing after Inertia, distracting them while Valerie Perez released the Speed Force. In a panic, Captain Cold, Heatwave, and Weather Wizard kill Bart.

Mourners held a candlelight vigil at the Flash Museum. Outside Titans Tower in San Francisco, a memorial statue of Bart in his Kid Flash uniform was placed next to the statue of Superboy.

As Wally West's return to New Earth coincided exactly with Bart's death, Inertia alleged that Bart's loss of powers was a direct consequence of Wally absorbing the newly released Speed Force. However, no further blame was put on Wally, who then avenged his protégé by freezing Inertia's body in time but leaving his mind active. Inertia was put on display in a new area of the Flash Museum, dedicated to Bart's life. In Final Crisis: Rogues Revenge, Inertia was unfrozen and continued his rampage trying to kill Bart Allen's family, but was stopped by the Flash's enemy Zoom. Zoom revealed that he wanted Inertia to become the new Kid Flash. Inertia stole Zoom's time manipulation power, leaving Zoom unable to even walk, and renamed himself "Kid Zoom." The Rogues and Kid Zoom battled, and, Kid Zoom was incapacitated by the Pied Piper, at which point the Rogues killed him. The Rogues delivered Inertia's corpse to Keystone City with a message reading "Tell the Flash we're even – The Rogues."

Marc Guggenheim, writer of the story arc in which Bart dies, has stated that this was an editorial decision, and that he was instructed that his five-issue run would have to end with Bart's death and the involvement of the Rogues.

Keystone City held a funeral for Bart, in which Jay Garrick, Cyborg, Wonder Girl and Robin gave eulogies. At the end of his own speech, Robin played a video Bart made soon after he had taken on the mantle of Kid Flash. In it Bart relayed to his friends that no matter what happened to him, he would always be proud of having been a part of the Flash legacy, and how happy he was being a member of the Teen Titans. Shortly after the Keystone funeral, a more private funeral was held for Bart at Titans Tower, where they erected a golden statue of Bart as Kid Flash beside the statue of Superboy.

During the Sinestro Corps invasion of Earth, Superboy-Prime's first act was to visit and defile Bart's grave which was inscribed "Bart Allen: The Flash". Superboy-Prime used his heat vision to cross out "The Fastest Man Alive" and write in its place "stupidest boy dead".

Return: Kid Flash again
In Final Crisis: Legion of 3 Worlds mini-series, Bart Allen returns as his teenage self in his Kid Flash attire when Brainiac 5 enacts phase two of his plan to defeat Superboy-Prime and the Legion of Super-Villains. His resurrection is brought about by the activation of the "living lightning rod" first seen in The Lightning Saga. Brainiac 5 explains that Bart was destined to die one way or another, because his leap from child to adult had jump-started Bart's hyper-accelerated aging again, and that had the Rogues not killed him, he would have been dead of old age within months. Because he is needed for the battle against Superboy-Prime, Brainiac 5 sends the Legion back to the 21st century to use Wally West's lightning bolt to house Bart's childlike Speed Force essence. In the 31st, he then uses the combined power of the Lightning Lads and Lighting Lasses, along with XS running on the cosmic treadmill, to release Bart from the Speed Force. Bart and XS make mention that they feel a new strength emanating from the Speed Force, suggesting they can feel Barry Allen's return, although Bart believes it to be Max Mercury instead.

Soon after Bart's resurrection, Superboy is also resurrected by the Legion. Together the pair aid the Legion in defeating Superboy-Prime by having him destroy himself (literally). Bart tries to convince XS to return to the past with him, but she instead decides to stay in the future, getting to know their new Earth.

Once returned to the present, Superman assembles the Teen Titans as well as the adult Titans together, and re-introduces them to Kid Flash and Superboy.

The Flash: Rebirth
In The Flash: Rebirth storyline, Bart quickly discovers that things had changed significantly since he had been away. Barry Allen, his grandfather and legendary speedster who had sacrificed himself against the battle with the Anti-Monitor, had also returned from the grave. At Teen Titans Tower West, where Robin and Wonder Girl have planned a welcome home party for Bart while everyone else is at the parades for Barry, Bart views his grandfather's return with skepticism, admitting a desire for things to "go back to the way it used to be". He wishes that Wally was still the primary Flash and he would still be his sidekick. Bart's bitterness, though, centers on feeling angry that Barry is the only one to escape the Speed Force and his former mentor, Max Mercury had not.

Bart, along with others connected to the Speed Force, are struck with severe pain when Barry accidentally kills the speedster Savitar by merely touching him. When Barry accidentally kills another evil speedster, it is revealed that he is now the new Black Flash. The JLA and JSA work together to contain Barry in a machine that will sever his ties to the Speed Force. Bart rushes to the scene and confronts Barry over the reason why Max has not returned, but his grandfather cannot provide an answer. The Black Flash part of Barry quickly takes over, shattering the machine and attempting to reach out to the speedsters, including Bart, in the area. Barry is rushed away by his friends as Bart, Wally, Iris, and Jay look on.

Superman tells Bart and the others that Barry has decided to run back into the Speed Force to protect them. Wally decides to follow Barry and bring him back, and Bart asks him to bring back Max. Shortly after Wally leaves, Linda contacts Jay and Bart to tell them that Professor Zoom, the Reverse-Flash, is at her house attacking Jay and Iris. Bart and Jay rush to the scene, and fight Professor Zoom through the city. During their fight, Professor Zoom criticizes Bart for being a pollutant in the Thawne line due to being a descendant of both an Allen and a Thawne. He bests Bart with ease and is about to stab him with his staff, when Max Mercury suddenly returns from the Speed Force. Bart is shocked and overjoyed by his mentor's return. Wally and Barry return as well and the group of speedsters charge the Reverse-Flash, ready for a fight.

In the aftermath of the battle with the Reverse-Flash, an encounter with Jesse Chambers causes Wally's daughter Iris to manifest a connection to the Speed Force. Much to Bart's surprise, Iris decides to don Bart's old costume and become the new Impulse.

Blackest Night
With Bart and Conner Kent's return, both of their statues are removed from the Titans Tower's memorial. However, Nekron, the "black personification" of Death, seeks to reclaim their lives during the Blackest Night crossover. Bart, along with Wally, races across the globe to warn every hero of the Black Lantern Corps' invasion. Bart later arrives at Coast City with Wally and scatters members of the Justice League and Teen Titans to take a stand against Nekron, who is responsible for the Black Lanterns. Despite being resurrected, Bart's previous status as a deceased still allows one of the undead lord's black rings to transform him into a Black Lantern.

After his grandfather is chosen as a Blue Lantern by Ganthet of the Guardians of the Universe and leader of the Blue Lantern Corps, Bart immediately engages in battle with him. Barry's blue power ring detects that Bart is still alive, but will die if he is not freed from the black ring soon. Barry nearly releases Bart from the black ring using blue energy constructs crafted in the images of Bart as Impulse and Kid Flash, before interference by Black Lantern versions of Professor Zoom and Solovar stops him. Wally and Blue Lantern Saint Walker join Barry to fight against them. Bart attempts to use his speed powers to kill Wally, only to be temporarily returned to normal. Realizing that their mutual connection to the Speed Force can save Bart, Barry uses his powers to break the ring's connection, freeing him.

Return to Titans
Sometime after Blackest Night, Bart and Conner are recruited by Cyborg to help rescue a current Titan by the name of Static, who had been kidnapped while visiting his hometown of Dakota. The three heroes arrive at the scene of a battle between the Teen Titans and a superhuman gangster named Holocaust, and intervene just as he is about to finish off their comrades. Bart and Conner then comment that it's time for them to come out of "retirement" and rejoin the Teen Titans. Holocaust simply laughs and tells them to bring it, and Bart responds by saying "We were hoping you'd say that". After a lengthy battle, Bart deals the finishing blow to the villain by running around him fast enough to open a vacuum which sucks him into the Earth's inner core.

At the behest of Tim Drake, Bart travels to Gotham City and saves Selina Kyle from members of the League of Assassins while she is sleeping in her apartment. After knocking out the would-be killers, Bart remarks to Tim over the radio that Selina is "super-fine", and that this may be the best day of his life.

Shortly after settling back in Titans Tower, Bart reveals to Conner that during his brief stay in the future, he went through a number of records and schematics concerning technology from the era. He also tells Conner that he is losing his memories of this future information due to the time stream being corrected, and that he is writing down everything he can remember.

Flashpoint
When Iris West Allen calls Barry home, she, Jay Garrick, Wally West, and Bart Allen are all troubled by the way that he has been isolating himself from everyone. Bart believes that Barry dislikes him and runs off until he is attacked by Hot Pursuit. Barry arrives too late, when Hot Pursuit discharges electricity at Bart with his baton and is engulfed in lightning. However, Hot Pursuit mistakenly believes that Bart is not one of the anomalies that are affecting the timeline, known as the Flashpoint.

The Earth is a changed alternate timeline, where Bart Allen wakes up in the 31st century in Brainiac's stasis pod chamber in 31st century and has lost his super-speed. After failing to avoid being re-captured by Brainiac, he is confronted by a female Hot Pursuit and with her help, pulls away from Brainiac. This Hot Pursuit reveals herself to be Patty Spivot, Barry Allen's assistant. Bart must find a way to get his super-speed back before being erased from existence. Bart learns that Patty stole Hot Pursuit's motorcycle and has taken his place. Bart allows himself to be recaptured by Brainiac and is placed into a stasis pod, destroying Brainiac's security program from the inside. Patty holds of Brainiac and breaks an energy projector, which returns Bart's super-speed to him. Bart then runs through time to the 21st century, and promises Patty he will return and rescue her. However, Bart's body was transforming into the Black Flash that had been controlled by the Speed Force, taking him to reduce the speedsters Max Mercury, Jay Garrick, and Wally West. Bart reversed from the Black Flash and runs into Barry, when he realizes that the Speed Force is encased for him. Bart is to be absorbed into the living embodiment of the Speed Force's light that gives Barry his power and tells him to save the world.

DC Rebirth

Prior to Bart Allen's reappearance, the Titans Tomorrow alternate-future version of Bart Allen reappears in the 2018 crossover storyline “Super-Sons of Tomorrow”. A shattered figure of Bart Allen wearing his Impulse costume is also seen in the Flash Museum in the 25th Century.

The original Bart Allen returns to the main DC universe after Wally West and Barry Allen break the Force Barrier. Once again wearing the Impulse costume, he emerges from the Speed Force and races through a city street triumphantly declaring that he is back.

Shortly afterward, he reunites with his former Young Justice and Teen Titans teammates Robin (Tim Drake) and Wonder Girl (Cassandra Sandsmark). Bart is the main driving force behind the revival of the Young Justice team; after being transported to Gemworld and reunited with Superboy (Kon-El), the team officially re-forms.

Powers and abilities
Bart's primary power is speed, along with abilities that are common to comics speedsters, such as creating whirlwinds, running on water, and vibrating through matter. The latter ability results in "molecular taffy" if Bart does not concentrate; he also possesses an aura, that prevents air friction while running. Bart does possess some abilities that other speedsters do not have. He has the ability to produce "scouts", Speed Force avatars that he can send through the timestream, but has used it infrequently since the death of one avatar put him in a coma during the "Our Worlds at War" storyline that crossed over among the Impulse, Superboy, and Young Justice titles. After being forced to use it during the "World Without Young Justice" crossover event, he was able and willing to use them with ease, up until he became Kid Flash. He has been shown to move faster than light as Impulse, while now he has an artificial knee which limits his speed as Kid Flash. He now can only travel close to the speed of light.

Bart is resistant to the alterations in the time stream. His parents met only in post-Zero Hour continuity, but he arrived before the event. Bart has the ability to recall everything he has ever read, heard or watched (which includes speed-reading every book in the San Francisco Public Library), allowing him to spout encyclopedic information concerning the situation at hand as well as quotations from Mark Twain, of whose work he is fond. He has also displayed the ability to create powerful radio waves by rotating his arms at high speeds and using the resulting vibrations in conjunction with his teammate Static's electromagnetic abilities.

After Infinite Crisis, Bart's connection to the Speed Force is more difficult to control because he now contains the Speed Force and, in essence, is the Speed Force. When he taps into the Speed Force, Bart appears to have electricity crackling around him, and the Speed Force inside him becomes so lethal that he initially wears the Flash suit while running to prevent it from killing him. After remembering his experiences on an alternate Earth during a fight with Griffin, he began to gain a measure of control over the Speed Force before it was released from his body just prior to his death.

Flash legacy
Since his first appearance in The Flash #91, Bart had been trained by several speed-endowed heroes such as Jay Garrick, Johnny Quick, and Max Mercury. Prior to his reluctance to don the red and yellow, Bart showed a lot of enthusiasm toward his role as the future Flash. However, Wally West had a number of apprehensions about Bart, as shown by Wally's naming Jesse Quick as his successor and his refusal to deliver to Bart his invitation from Cyborg to join the latest incarnation of the Teen Titans. Bart took these acts in stride though, and, after Robin claimed that he will always live in the Flash's shadow, Bart even says that "the Flash will be in mine".

Other versions
Numerous versions of Bart have appeared throughout comics.

Bar Torr

After the DC universe was rebooted in 2011, a new incarnation of the character was introduced with a substantially rewritten history. Teen Titans (vol. 4) #1 opens with an amnesiac Bart six months prior to his first appearance, saving a mansion from a fire. He cannot explain how he is able to move at superhuman speeds, but he is certain that he has a connection to the Flash, and so begins to call himself "Kid Flash". The second issue identifies this Kid Flash as Bart Allen. Virgil Hawkins, a brilliant intern from S.T.A.R. Labs, performs diagnostic tests on Bart and concludes that Bart is not from the 21st Century, indicating that he may possibly be from the 30th Century. Based on his test, Virgil presents Kid Flash with a new uniform, one that can keep his molecules aligned. This Bart Allen is also hinted to be from the future as his flashes from the future and the Legion Lost team's recollection of him from their history indicate.

In Justice League of America's Vibe, Amanda Waller deduces from testing his abilities against Vibe's that Kid Flash draws power from the Speed Force, which Vibe is able to disrupt. When they accidentally touch, Kid Flash's past appears before Vibe's eyes, and he is shown to be a criminal from Earth's future. Kid Flash says he has no recollection of his past, nor why he has been sent back in time. The pair find the spot where he first arrived from Earth's future, which Kid Flash had been dreaming about for some time, but Bart flees the scene because he distrusts the JLA. In The Flash #21, Kid Flash meets the Flash (Barry Allen). Barry learns Kid Flash is from the future and also senses that his powers do not stem from the Speed Force. Kid Flash claims that Bart Allen is not his real name, and refuses to say who gave it to him. He also denies the Flash the opportunity to share his own secret identity with Bart.

Bart Allen's new origin story is later given in Teen Titans (vol. 4) #25 and 26 (December 2013, January 14). His real name is explained to be Bar Torr, having been sent to the 21st century as part of a witness protection program ahead of his trial for terrible crimes. A feared reactionary from a dystopian alien world Altros Prime in the far future, Bar Torr was the son of a religious couple who were murdered by the Purifiers, agents of the oppressive regime of the Functionary. An orphan, Bar managed to put his sister Shira into the care of a nunnery after many brutal years spent protecting her. Too young to kill any Purifiers himself, he joined their ranks instead. Following a space ship crash while smuggling contraband for the Purifiers, Torr discovered that by unknown means he had acquired healing abilities and incredible super speed, which he later used to get bloody revenge on the Purifiers, sending a message of hope to the oppressed people of his homeworld. He later assembled an army of reactionaries and began a full-scale rebellion against the Functionary which lasted many years, until members of his rebellion seriously injured an older Shira, who grew up on the side of the Functionary. This prompted Bar to turn himself in. Seeking penance, he promised the Functionary he would take down his own rebellion from the inside. While the prosecution assembled its case against Bar, he was sent back to the 21st century with a new personality and new memories, as Bart Allen, and only a lingering feeling that he was pursuing redemption. In the present day, in the wake of an attack on the team by Johnny Quick of the Crime Syndicate, the prosecution retrieves Bart and brings him and the team to the future once again, where he awaits trial, and his friends learn of his past atrocities. During his trial, Kid Flash admits being guilty and the rest of his future resistance come and attack. During the fight Bart reunites with his sister and she convinces him to surrender. Bart is sentenced to life on the prison planet Takron-Galtos. Solstice then proclaims her love for him and kills a judge to be imprisoned with Bar. After a brief goodbye with Red Robin they are sent away to prison.

Bart returns to the 21st century and is next seen with the Elite alongside Klarion the Witch Boy, Trinity of the Indigo Tribe and the Guardian. He confronts his old teammates, angry because he feels Red Robin abandoned him and Solstice in the future and never came back for him, implying that he has spent centuries waiting. He ultimately rejoins the Teen Titans, but soon afterwards returns to the future, leaving behind a note saying that he intends to rescue Solstice from Takron-Galtos by himself.

Dark Tomorrow
Following the death of Max Mercury and Helen Claiborne, Bart went back to the future to be with his mother, while his girlfriend Carol Bucklen came along. Carol began studying the Speed Force to use it for the benefit of humanity. The corrupt President Thawne, Bart's grandfather, took their research and made the Hyperguard, a group of hyper-fast soldiers. The adult Carol managed to pull her younger self and Bart into the future. Bart ended up preventing Max's and Helen's death, thus preventing this reality from happening. This reality appeared in Impulse #73–75.

Titans Tomorrow
Bart was a crucial part of the Titans Tomorrow storyline. Here, Wally West was dead and Bart was the new Flash. The Teen Titans were now fanatic superheroes controlling the western United States. However, Bart was really a spy for Titans East, a rebel group led by Cyborg and Bumblebee. He seemed to have a romantic relationship with Rose Wilson.

The Titans Tomorrow group has recently returned, where it was revealed that due to Bart's recent death, the future timeline has been altered so these versions of him and Conner are actually clones of the originals, created by the alternate future version of Tim Drake. However, unlike his previous future self, the cloned Bart is completely on the side of his fascist teammates.

Time and Tempest
Another alternate future is showcased in The Ray (vol. 2) #25–26. Here Bart, Ray Terrill, and Triumph were "three rich guys with superpowers". Bart was in love with Ray's girlfriend, whom Ray treated like dirt. However, Bart realized that he did not have a chance with her either and ended up knocking Ray out and leaving him, not knowing that hitmen were on their way.

In other media

Television

Animation

 Bart Allen as Impulse appears in Kids' WB's original pitch for Justice League as a junior member of the eponymous team. While Impulse, among other characters, were ultimately cut to avoid making the series feel like Super Friends, the pitch became available as a bonus on the series' season one DVD.
 Bart Allen as Kid Flash appears in the Mad segment "That's What Super Friends Are For", voiced by Jason Marsden.
 Bart Allen appears in Young Justice, voiced again by Jason Marsden. This version hails from a Reach-controlled future in the year 2056. Introduced in the second season, Invasion as Impulse, he and Neutron build a time machine so he travel back in time to the 21st century to save his grandfather, Barry Allen, prevent Neutron from becoming a supervillain, and avert the Reach-controlled future despite knowing it will be a one-way trip. Over the course of his mission, Bart joins the Team, becomes Jaime Reyes' best friend, gets adopted by Jay and Joan Garrick, and reluctantly becomes the new Kid Flash after Wally West is killed while helping the Team and Justice League thwart a Reach invasion. In the third and fourth seasons, Outsiders and Phantoms, Bart joins the Outsiders and enters a relationship with teammate El Dorado respectively.

Live-action

 A teenage Bart Allen appears in Smallville, portrayed by Kyle Gallner. Introduced in the episode "Run", this version is a self-centered thief who initially uses his powers for personal gain and has assumed the aliases of "Jay Garrick", "Barry Allen", and "Wally West". After helping Clark Kent save his father Jonathan Kent, Bart considers reforming and leaves to travel the world and find others like himself and Clark. As of the episode "Justice", he has assumed the codename "Impulse" despite not choosing it himself and joins forces with Green Arrow, among other heroes, to thwart Lex Luthor and LuthorCorp's plans. Following this, Bart makes minor appearances in the episodes "Doomsday" and "Icarus".
 Bart Allen appears in The Flash, portrayed by Jordan Fisher. This version is Barry Allen and Iris West-Allen's future son, younger brother of Nora West-Allen, and, according to showrunner Eric Wallace, is much older, funnier, charming than other incarnations, but with an edge.

Video games
 Bart Allen as Kid Flash appears as a playable character in Lego Batman 3: Beyond Gotham.
 The Young Justice incarnation of Bart Allen / Impulse appears as a non-playable character in Lego DC Super Villains.

Miscellaneous
 Bart Allen as Impulse appears in issue #15 of Legion of Super Heroes in the 31st Century.
 Bart Allen as Kid Flash appears in the Injustice: Gods Among Us prequel comic book as a member of the Teen Titans who was killed by the Joker's nuclear bomb.
 The Smallville incarnation of Bart Allen / Impulse appears in Smallville Season 11. In the "Haunted" arc, Bart and Clark Kent seek out Jay Garrick for help in defeating the Black Flash before Bart sacrifices himself to send the Black Flash into the Speed Force. Additionally, a young Bart appears in the "Legion" arc.

Collected editions
Stories featuring Bart Allen from The Flash, Impulse and The Flash: The Fastest Man Alive have been collected into trade paperback:

References

External links
Bart Allen at the DC Comics Database

Bart Allen at the Smallville Wiki

Characters created by Mark Waid
Characters created by Mike Wieringo
Comics characters introduced in 1994
DC Comics characters with accelerated healing
DC Comics characters with superhuman senses
DC Comics characters who can move at superhuman speeds
DC Comics child superheroes
DC Comics male superheroes
DC Comics metahumans  
DC Comics sidekicks
Fictional characters displaced in time
Fictional characters who can duplicate themselves
Fictional characters who can manipulate sound
Fictional characters who can manipulate time
Fictional characters who can turn intangible
Fictional characters who can turn invisible
Fictional characters with air or wind abilities
Fictional characters with density control abilities
Fictional characters with dimensional travel abilities
Fictional characters with energy-manipulation abilities
Fictional characters with electric or magnetic abilities
Fictional characters with elemental transmutation abilities 
Fictional characters with eidetic memory
Fictional characters with precognition
Fictional characters with slowed ageing
Flash (comics) characters
Teenage characters in comics
Teenage superheroes
Time travelers